Ulsan Citizen FC is a South Korean football club based in the Ulsan. The club is a member of the K3 League, the third tier football in South Korea, and it started to join K3 League Basic in the 2019 season until promotion to the third tier in 2020 as runner-up.

Honours
K3 League Basic
Winners (1): 2019
K4 League
Winners (0):
Runner-up (1): 2020

Season by season records

Current squad
As of 2 July 2022

See also
 List of football clubs in South Korea

References

K3 League clubs
K4 League clubs
K3 League (2007–2019) clubs
Sport in Ulsan
Association football clubs established in 2018
2018 establishments in South Korea